Duel in the Sun (nicknamed Lust in the Dust) is a 1946 American psychological Western film directed by King Vidor, produced and written by David O. Selznick, which tells the story of a Mestiza (half-Native American) girl who goes to live with her white relatives, becoming involved in prejudice and forbidden love. The Technicolor film stars Jennifer Jones, Joseph Cotten, Gregory Peck, Lillian Gish and Lionel Barrymore.

Plot
Pearl Chavez is orphaned after her father Scott Chavez kills her mother, having caught her with a lover. Before Scott Chavez is executed as a punishment for killing his wife, he arranges for his daughter Pearl to live with his second cousin and old sweetheart, Laura Belle in Texas.

Arriving by stagecoach, Pearl is met by Jesse McCanles, one of Laura Belle's two grown sons. He takes her to Spanish Bit, their enormous cattle ranch. The gentle and gracious Laura Belle is happy to welcome her to their home, but not so her husband, the Senator Jackson McCanles, who uses a wheelchair. He calls Pearl "a half-breed" and jealously despises Pearl's father.

The second son, Lewt, is a ladies' man with a personality quite unlike that of his gentlemanly brother Jesse. He expresses his interest in Pearl in direct terms and she takes a strong dislike to him. Laura Belle calls in Mr. Jubal Crabbe, the "Sinkiller", a gun-toting preacher, to counsel Pearl on how to avoid the evils of temptation. Pearl is determined to remain "a good girl."

When she submits to Lewt's aggressive advances one night, Pearl is angry with him and ashamed of her own behavior. But she also cannot help but be flattered by his lust and attentions. Jesse, meanwhile, is ostracized by his father and no longer welcome at the ranch after siding with railroad men, headed by Mr. Langford, against the Senator's personal interests. Jesse is in love with Pearl but he leaves for Austin to pursue a political career and becomes engaged to Helen Langford, Langford's daughter.

Offended when Lewt reneges on a promise to marry her, Pearl takes up with Sam Pierce, a neighboring rancher who is smitten with her. She does not love him but says yes to his proposal. Before they can be married, however, Lewt picks a fight with Pierce in a saloon and guns him down. He insists that Pearl can belong only to him.  Lewt becomes a wanted man.

On the run from the law, Lewt finds time to derail a train and occasionally drop by the ranch late at night and press his attentions on Pearl. She cannot resist her desire for him and lies for Lewt to the law, hiding him in her room.  Afterward, however, he walks out on her, despite her pleas that she loves him.

Laura Belle's health takes a turn for the worse and the Senator admits his love for her before she dies. Jesse returns to visit but is too late; his mother is dead. The Senator continues to shun him, as does Lewt, their family feud finally resulting in a showdown. Lewt tosses a gun to his unarmed brother but Jesse stands his ground without attempting to pick it up.  Jesse warns that Lewt will eventually be hanged as a murderer, and Lewt responds by shooting Jesse.

The Senator's old friend, Lem Smoot tells him that Jesse's wound is not mortal and the old man softens up towards his son and reconciles. Pearl is relieved that Jesse is going to survive. When Helen arrives, she invites Pearl to leave Spanish Bit forever and come live with them in Austin. Pearl agrees, but when she is tipped off by one of the Spanish Bit hands that Lewt intends to come after Jesse again, she arms herself and engages in a shootout with Lewt in the desert. They die in each other's arms.

Cast

Production
The film was adapted by Oliver H.P. Garrett and David O. Selznick from the novel by Niven Busch. The film proved to be a turbulent experience for Selznick and Vidor, with several directors being left uncredited for their work in the film, such as Josef von Sternberg, William Dieterle, William Cameron Menzies, Otto Brower, Sidney Franklin and Selznick himself. Production unit managers Glenn Cook and William McGarry were also uncredited.

The movie was filmed in Wildwood Regional Park in Thousand Oaks, California.

As shot, the film could not make it past the Hays Code censors or religious review boards and so was heavily edited by state censor boards while several states (mostly in the South but also in New England) refused to licence the film. It was nicknamed Lust in the Dust, which eventually became the name of another movie. A scene in which Pearl does a seductive dance for Lewton was cut from the film before it was released.

The train derailment scenes were filmed on the Sierra Railroad in Tuolumne County, California, using a combination of a real train and large scale models.

Reception

Critical reaction
Bosley Crowther of The New York Times wrote, "For, despite all his flashy exploitation, Mr. Selznick can't long hide the fact that his multimillion-dollar Western is a spectacularly disappointing job...Those are also harsh words about a picture which promises very much and which, even for all its disappointments, has some flashes of brilliance in it. But the ultimate banality of the story and its juvenile slobbering over sex (or should we say "primitive passion," as says a ponderous foreword?) compels their use." William Brogdon of Variety gave the film a favorable review writing, "As a production it adds no class distinction to David O. Selznick but assures him a top commercial success. The star lineup is impressive. Vastness of the western locale is splendidly displayed in color by mobile cameras. Footage is overwhelmingly expansive, too much so at times considering its length."

Harrison's Reports deemed the film as a glorified' Western, produced on an immense scale. Its theme is tragic love-making, with tragic consequences...Some of the photographic shots are extremely effective; they make the film look immense." Edwin Schallert of the Los Angeles Times praised the film as "a picture of terrific in fact, well-nigh bewildering impact. It embodies a strange tragical drama of love, hate and death, set against wild western desert wastes and mesas and fierce mountain fastnesses. Historical in pattern, the narrative, as told on the screen, seems to draw from the most elemental sources, with few of its characters that are not, at times, motivated by the most primitive and even brutal impulses. A tremendously strong production, lurid and violent in the handling of many of its scenes, it still possesses a bigness of design which commands appreciation and respect."

Box office
It was shown at increased admission prices which boosted its earnings to $8.7 million in rentals in the United States and Canada during its initial release.

Because of the film's huge production costs (rumored to be over $6,000,000), its $2,000,000 advertising campaign (unheard of at the time) and Selznick's costly distribution tactics, the film only broke even.

Awards and nominations

Legacy
The film was one of the first to be honored by a record album, featuring selections from Dimitri Tiomkin's musical score. Rather than use excerpts from the soundtrack, RCA Victor recorded some of the music with the Boston Pops Orchestra conducted by Arthur Fiedler. The music was split into approximately three-minute sections and released on 10-inch 78-rpm discs in 1946. A musical prelude lasting nine and a half minutes as well as a two-minute overture preceded the film with Tiomkin conducting the studio orchestra; this recording was later issued on LP and CD.

Duel in the Sun was first shown on American television on ABC on January 23, 1972. It was released on Region 1 DVD in 2004.

Martin Scorsese has stated to James Lipton on Inside the Actors Studio that this was the first film he saw and holds it in high regard. He mentioned it in his documentary of American movies. David Stratton has also stated a similar high opinion of the film, at the ACMI's  "Desert Island Flicks" on March 10, 2010,. He first saw the film at the age of six.

The film is recognized by American Film Institute in these lists:
 2002: AFI's 100 Years...100 Passions – Nominated
 2005: AFI's 100 Years of Film Scores – Nominated
 2008: AFI's 10 Top 10:
 Nominated Western Film

Many of the film's plot points (such as the Pearl/Lewt/Sam love triangle) were reused in the Hindi movie Janbaaz (1986). In February 2020, the film was shown at the 70th Berlin International Film Festival, as part of a retrospective dedicated to King Vidor's career.

Duel in the Sun was remade as Saiyan in Hindi, and was released in 1951.

Scholarship
Duel in the Sun was released the same year as John Ford's film My Darling Clementine and has been described as taking "the moment of sadism" from Ford's film to extremes. Released in the postwar years during a period of economic boom and the changing role of women in society including marriage, sexuality and inclusion in the work force that left some Americans feeling alienated. Psychological westerns, popular in the 1940s, featured characters plagued by a dark torment that reflected the post-war attitudes. The march of progress is symbolized by an advancing railroad cutting across a senator's cattle lands.

The "civilizing forces" of the American West are represented by the characters of Pearl's father, Laura Belle and Jesse, while Lewt and Senator McCanles are constant reminders that she is not part of the white patriarchal order. After being raped by Lewt, Pearl is not able to meet the Victorian-era standards for moral conduct. Her identity as part Indian is "linked to notions of uncontrollable drives, the fading of subjectivity, and the loss of conscious agency". Believing she encouraged the rape, Jesse ends their romantic relationship. The "dark" or savage element of her sexuality and unrestrained passions has a racial dimension, contrasted with the white feminine ideal in the film's imagery, it is something needing to be tamed. She is "too sexual to be a proper wife, too dark to be a comfortable part of [white] society, and too passionate to be controlled with anything but violence".

As Pearl is already "spoiled" by the rape she no longer needs to control her sexuality and enters into a sadomasochistic relationship with Lewt who treats her viciously and with racist abuse like calling her a "bob-tailed little half-breed". Marriage with Pearl is out of the question for Lewt due to his father's expectations that the family ranch not be "turned into an Injun reservation" though Lewt continues to exhibit jealous, controlling behaviors including attempting to murder his brother Jesse when he makes plans for Pearl to attend school in Austin. While in many ways the typical hero of American westerns, Lewt crosses over into the realm of the "savage" or "uncivilized". The violence Pearl encounters from Lewt leads her to develop gradually into a femme fatale type character who eventually murders him even as she loves him in order to protect the goodness of Jesse and his fiancée Helen.

See also
 List of American films of 1946
 Lillian Gish filmography

References

External links

 
 
 
 

1946 films
1940s English-language films
Films scored by Dimitri Tiomkin
Films based on American novels
Films directed by King Vidor
Films directed by William Dieterle
Selznick International Pictures films
Films set on farms
Films set in the 1860s
Films set in the 1880s
Films about capital punishment
Films set in Texas
1946 Western (genre) films
American Western (genre) epic films
Films about interracial romance
Films produced by David O. Selznick
1940s American films